is a 2009 Japanese film directed and starring by Hitoshi Matsumoto.
It was nominated for the Asian Film Awards in the categories of Best Actor and Best Visual Effects. It has not received a U.S. release.

The film was greeted negatively by Japanese audiences; however, it received a surprisingly warmer reaction in the West, despite not being commercialized outside Japan.

Plot
The film contains two major story lines. The first takes place in Mexico and centers around a masked wrestler called Escargot Man and his family as they prepare for a match that night. His family worries about him since the luchador is growing older and his slated opponent is stronger and younger than him. Nevertheless, his son and father are excited to see the match. These portions of the film are realistic, with dialogue in Spanish.

In the second, more surreal storyline, a Japanese man wakes up in an empty white room with no apparent ceiling from which he struggles to escape. The two-story lines eventually indirectly converge.

Production 
Matsumoto not only wrote the script and directed the film, he also stars as the man trapped in the white room. Being that large parts of the narrative is based on non-verbal communication and set in a singular space, Symbol is comparable to films like Aragami (Ryuhei Kitamura) and the Cube film series.

Reception
TBA

References

External links 
 

2000s Japanese-language films
Films directed by Hitoshi Matsumoto
2000s Japanese films